Hiddensee is a former East German Navy corvette, now part of the Battleship Cove site at Fall River, Massachusetts. Originally a Soviet vessel, the corvette was transferred first to the East German Navy, then to the German Navy, and ended her career in the United States.

Ship history
The Tarantul I-class missile corvette was launched in 1984 at the Petrovsky Shipyard in Leningrad, Russia. She was commissioned in 1985 by the East German Volksmarine as Rudolf Egelhofer, but after the reunification of Germany in 1990, she was transferred to the German Navy and renamed Hiddensee.

After decommissioning in April 1991, she was transferred to the United States Navy. As USNS Hiddensee (185NS9201), the ship was extensively evaluated at the Naval Air Warfare Center at Solomons, Maryland, and used for naval exercises. Following naval budget cuts, the ship was removed from service in April 1996, and joined the Battleship Cove fleet on 14 June 1997.

References

External links

WilliamMaloney.com: Hiddensee Photos of the Hiddensee, Battleship Cove Naval Museum, Fall River, MA

Museum ships in Massachusetts
Fall River, Massachusetts
Museums in Bristol County, Massachusetts
Military and war museums in Massachusetts
Corvettes of the Volksmarine
1984 ships
Corvettes of the German Navy
Ships built in the Soviet Union
Ships built in Saint Petersburg
Tarantul-class corvettes